Qi Jingyi (1656-1719), also known as Hilal al-Din, was a Chinese Sufi master, instrumental in the spread of the Qadiriyyah school among Chinese Muslims. He was known among his followers as  Qi Daozu (祁道祖), i.e. Grand Master Qi.

Life
According to Qi Jingyi's followers, the 16-year-old Qi Jingyi met the revered master Afaq Khwaja in Xining in 1672, and asked him to become his teacher. Afaq Khwaja supposedly said in response: "I am not your teacher; my ancient teaching is not to be passed on to you; your teacher has already crossed the Eastern Sea and arrived in the Eastern land. You must therefore return home quickly, and you will become a famous teacher in your land."

He later studied under  Khwaja Sayyed Abdullāh, a 29th generation descendant of Prophet Muhammad, who had entered China in 1674.

Death
Qi Jingyi's grave in Linxia City has become the center of the shrine complex known as Da Gongbei, or the "Great Tomb", which remains the center of the Qadiriyyah in China.

References

17th-century Chinese people
18th-century Chinese people
Chinese Sufis
Hui people
Qadiri order
1656 births
1719 deaths